Almost like a Whale by Steve Jones is a modern introduction to Charles Darwin's Origin of Species and closely follows its structure. It won the 1999 BP Natural World Book Prize.

An American version was published as Darwin's Ghost: The Origin of Species Updated.

The title refers to Darwin's observation that a bear, swimming in a lake and catching insects in its mouth, might conceivably evolve over time into a creature "almost like a whale". This statement attracted much ridicule at the time.

References

1999 non-fiction books
Biology books
Books by Steve Jones (biologist)
Evolutionary biology literature
1999 in biology